Sri Nanduri Sai Prasad (born 1944) is an Indian scientist, philosopher and author. Born in Gollapalli, Krishna district in Andhra Pradesh, he obtained his bachelor's degree from Mysore University. After completing post-graduation at Kerala University Prasad joined the Indian Space Research Organisation (ISRO) when it was still in its infancy in 1969.

Bibliography

N.S. Prasad has published several works dealing with science and philosophy. Below is an inexhaustive list of his works:

 Prof. Prasad, Sri N.S., (1998). Will Science Come to an End, Allied Publishers Limited, .
 Prof. Prasad, Sri N.S., (1991). Science and Sankara in Search of Highest Truth, Bhartiya Vidya Bhavan (Bombay)
 Prof. Prasad, Sri N.S., (1987). Science and Hindu Philosophy, Motilal Banarsidas (New Delhi)
 Prof. Prasad, Sri N.S., (2017). Consciousness is Truth, World is an Illusion , Notion Press, Chennai
 Prof. Prasad, Sri N.S., (2003). Perfect Health
 Prof. Prasad, Sri N.S., (2020). My 108 Quotes
 Prof. Prasad, Sri N.S., (2022). "The End of Knowledge" By Nanduri Sai Prasad, IJAEM, 22 June

1944 births
People from Krishna district
Indian Space Research Organisation people
Scientists from Andhra Pradesh
Philosophers of science
Living people
University of Kerala alumni
Writers from Andhra Pradesh
20th-century Indian non-fiction writers
20th-century Indian philosophers
Indian technology writers
Indian religious writers
Scholars from Andhra Pradesh